In 2016, the foremost athletics events will be staged at the Olympic Games in Rio de Janeiro. The two other major global level competitions in 2016 are the World Indoor Championships and World Half Marathon Championships.

A new addition to the continental tournament schedule came in the form of the 2016 European Athletics Youth Championships. Two long-running competitions were renamed and held under new titles in 2016. The World Junior Championships in Athletics became the 2016 IAAF World U20 Championships and the IAAF World Race Walking Cup was held as the 2016 IAAF World Race Walking Team Championships.

The hosting of the two above events had to be reopened as they were affected by the suspension of the All-Russia Athletic Federation as a result of contraventions of the World Anti-Doping Code. As a major nation in athletics, Russia's ban meant the absence of many world class athletes from competition. Kenya – another prominent country – was subject to a World Anti-Doping Agency plan to improve its own anti-doping infrastructure, on pain of exclusion from international events.

Major championships

World

Olympic Games
Paralympic Games
World Indoor Championships
World Race Walking Team Championships
World Half Marathon Championships
World U20 Championships
World Mountain Running Championships
WMA World Masters Indoor Championships
FISU Cross Country Championships
IAU 24 Hour World Championships
IAU 100 km World Championships

Regional

African Championships
African Cross Country Championships
Arab Cross Country Championships
Arab Junior Championships
Asian Indoor Championships
Asian Junior Championships
Asian Cross Country Championships
Asian Race Walking Championships
South Asian Games
European Athletics Championships
European Cross Country Championships
European Throwing Cup
European Mountain Running Championships
Mediterranean U23 Championships in Athletics
Ibero-American Championships
NACAC Under-23 Championships
CARIFTA Games
South American U23 Championships
South American Youth Championships
South American Cross Country Championships
Pan American Combined Events Cup
Pan American Cross Country Cup

Seasonal events

Diamond League
IAAF Hammer Throw Challenge
IAAF Combined Events Challenge
IAAF Race Walking Challenge
World Marathon Majors
 Tokyo
 Boston
 London
 Berlin
 Chicago
 New York City
IAAF Label Road Races

World records

Indoor

Outdoor

Awards

Men

Women

Doping
Among the first doping suspensions of the year was Kazakhstan hurdler Anastasiya Soprunova, who had won the Asian indoor title. Retests of samples taken at the 2008 Summer Olympics and 2012 Summer Olympics using new methods revealed several high-profile track athletes had given positive results, including major medallists for Russia.

Results

2016 Summer Olympics (IAAF)
 May 14 – 16: 2016 Ibero-American Championships in Athletics (Aquece Rio Athletics 2016) in  Rio de Janeiro (Olympic Test Event)
  won both the gold and overall medal tallies.
 August 12 – 21: 2016 Summer Olympics in  Rio de Janeiro at the Estádio Olímpico João Havelange
 Men
 Men's 100m:   Usain Bolt;   Justin Gatlin;   Andre De Grasse
 Men's 200m:   Usain Bolt;   Andre De Grasse;   Christophe Lemaitre
 Men's 400m:   Wayde van Niekerk (WR);   Kirani James;   LaShawn Merritt
 Men's 800m:   David Rudisha;   Taoufik Makhloufi;   Clayton Murphy
 Men's 1,500m:   Matthew Centrowitz Jr.;   Taoufik Makhloufi;   Nick Willis
 Men's 5,000m:   Mo Farah;   Paul Kipkemoi Chelimo;   Hagos Gebrhiwet
 Men's 10,000m:   Mo Farah;   Paul Tanui;   Tamirat Tola
 Men's 110m Hurdles:   Omar McLeod;   Orlando Ortega;   Dimitri Bascou
 Men's 400m Hurdles:   Kerron Clement;   Boniface Mucheru Tumuti;   Yasmani Copello
 Men's 3,000m Steeplechase:   Conseslus Kipruto (OR);   Evan Jager;   Mahiedine Mekhissi-Benabbad
 Men's 20 km Walk:   Wang Zhen;   Cai Zelin;   Dane Bird-Smith
 Men's 50 km Walk:   Matej Tóth;   Jared Tallent;   Hirooki Arai
 Men's High Jump:   Derek Drouin;   Mutaz Essa Barshim;   Bohdan Bondarenko
 Men's Pole Vault:   Thiago Braz da Silva (OR);   Renaud Lavillenie;   Sam Kendricks
 Men's Long Jump:   Jeff Henderson;   Luvo Manyonga;   Greg Rutherford
 Men's Triple Jump:   Christian Taylor;   Will Claye;   Dong Bin
 Men's Shot Put:   Ryan Crouser (OR);   Joe Kovacs;   Tomas Walsh
 Men's Discus Throw:   Christoph Harting;   Piotr Małachowski;   Daniel Jasinski
 Men's Hammer Throw:   Dilshod Nazarov;   Ivan Tsikhan;   Wojciech Nowicki
 Men's Javelin Throw:   Thomas Röhler;   Julius Yego;   Keshorn Walcott
 Men's Decathlon:   Ashton Eaton (OR);   Kévin Mayer;   Damian Warner
 Men's 4 × 100 metres Relay:  ;  ;  
 Men's 4 × 400 metres Relay:  ;  ;  
 Men's Marathon:   Eliud Kipchoge;   Feyisa Lilesa;   Galen Rupp
 Women
 Women's 100m:   Elaine Thompson;   Tori Bowie;   Shelly-Ann Fraser-Pryce
 Women's 200m:   Elaine Thompson;   Dafne Schippers;   Tori Bowie
 Women's 400m:   Shaunae Miller;   Allyson Felix;   Shericka Jackson
 Women's 800m:   Caster Semenya;   Francine Niyonsaba;   Margaret Wambui
 Women's 1,500m:   Faith Kipyegon;   Genzebe Dibaba;   Jennifer Simpson
 Women's 5,000m:   Vivian Cheruiyot (OR);   Hellen Onsando Obiri;   Almaz Ayana
 Women's 10,000m:   Almaz Ayana (WR);   Vivian Cheruiyot;   Tirunesh Dibaba
 Women's 100m Hurdles:   Brianna Rollins;   Nia Ali;   Kristi Castlin
 Women's 400m Hurdles:   Dalilah Muhammad;   Sara Petersen;   Ashley Spencer
 Women's 3,000m Steeplechase:   Ruth Jebet;   Hyvin Jepkemoi;   Emma Coburn
 Women's 20 km Walk:   Liu Hong;   María Guadalupe González;   Lü Xiuzhi
 Women's High Jump:   Ruth Beitia;   Mirela Demireva;   Blanka Vlašić
 Women's Pole Vault:   Ekaterini Stefanidi;   Sandi Morris;   Eliza McCartney
 Women's Long Jump:   Tianna Bartoletta;   Brittney Reese;   Ivana Španović
 Women's Triple Jump:   Caterine Ibargüen;   Yulimar Rojas;   Olga Rypakova
 Women's Shot Put:   Michelle Carter;   Valerie Adams;   Anita Márton
 Women's Discus Throw:   Sandra Perković;   Mélina Robert-Michon;   Denia Caballero
 Women's Hammer Throw:   Anita Włodarczyk (WR);   Zhang Wenxiu;   Sophie Hitchon
 Women's Javelin Throw:   Sara Kolak;   Sunette Viljoen;   Barbora Špotáková
 Women's Heptathlon:   Nafissatou Thiam;   Jessica Ennis-Hill;   Brianne Theisen-Eaton
 Women's 4 × 100 metres Relay:  ;  ;  
 Women's 4 × 400 metres Relay:  ;  ;  ;
 Women's Marathon:   Jemima Sumgong;   Eunice Kirwa;   Mare Dibaba

World athletics championships
 March 11 – 13: 2016 World University Cross Country Championships in  Cassino
 Men's 10.7 km winner:  Hicham Amghar
 Women's 6.2 km winner:  Sevilay Eytemis
 March 17 – 20: 2016 IAAF World Indoor Championships in  Portland, Oregon
 The  won both the gold and overall medal tallies.
 March 26: 2016 IAAF World Half Marathon Championships in  Cardiff
 Men's winner:  Geoffrey Kipsang Kamworor
 Women's winner:  Peres Jepchirchir
 Men's team winners: 
 Women's team winners: 
 May 7 & 8: 2016 IAAF World Race Walking Team Championships in  Rome
 Note: This event was taken away from Cheboksary, due to WADA and the IAAF report and votes against ARAF.
  won both the gold and overall medal tallies.
 July 19 – 24: 2016 IAAF World U20 Championships in  Bydgoszcz
 Note: This event was taken away from Kazan, due to WADA and the IAAF report and votes against ARAF.
 The  won both the gold and overall medal tallies.

2016 World Marathon Majors
 February 28: 2016 Tokyo Marathon
 Winners:  Feyisa Lilesa (m) /  Helah Kiprop (f)
 April 18: 2016 Boston Marathon
 Winners:  Lemi Berhanu Hayle (m) /  Atsede Baysa (f)
 April 24: 2016 London Marathon
 Winners:  Eliud Kipchoge (m) /  Jemima Sumgong (f)
 September 25: 2016 Berlin Marathon
 Winners:  Kenenisa Bekele (m) /  Aberu Kebede (f)
 October 9: 2016 Chicago Marathon
 Winners:  Abel Kirui (m) /  Florence Kiplagat (f)
 November 6: 2016 New York City Marathon (final)
 Winners:  Ghirmay Ghebreslassie (m) /  Mary Jepkosgei Keitany (f)

2016 IAAF Road Race Label Events (Gold)
 January 2:  Xiamen International Marathon
 Winners:  Vincent Kipruto (m) /  Worknesh Edesa (f)
 January 17:  Hong Kong Marathon
 Winners:  Mike Kiprotich Mutai (m) /  Letebrhan Haylay Gebreslasea (f)
 January 22:  Dubai Marathon
 Winners:  Tesfaye Abera (m) /  Tirfi Tsegaye (f)
 February 28:  World's Best 10K
 Winners:  Bedan Karoki (m) /  Mary Wacera Ngugi (f)
 March 6:  Lake Biwa Marathon (men only)
 Winner:  Lucas Rotich
 March 13:  Roma-Ostia Half Marathon
 Winners:  Solomon Kirwa Yego (m) /  Workenesh Degefa (f)
 March 13:  Nagoya Women's Marathon (women only)
 Winner:  Eunice Kirwa
 March 20:  Seoul International Marathon
 Winners:  Wilson Loyanae (m) /  Rose Chelimo (f)
 March 20:  Lisbon Half Marathon
 Winners:  Sammy Kitwara (m) /  Ruti Aga (f)
 April 2:  Prague Half Marathon
 Winners:  Daniel Wanjiru (m) /  Violah Jepchumba (f)
 April 3:  Paris Marathon
 Winners:  Cyprian Kimurgor Kotut (m) /  Visiline Jepkesho (f)
 April 10:  Rome Marathon
 Winners:  Amos Kipruto (m) /  Rahma Tusa (f)
 April 10:  Vienna City Marathon
 Winners:  Robert Chemosin (m) /  Shuko Genemo (f)
 April 10:  Rotterdam Marathon
 Winners:  Marius Kipserem (m) /  Letebrhan Haylay Gebreslasea (f)
 April 24:  Yangzhou Jianzhen International Half Marathon
 Winners:  Mosinet Geremew (m) /  Peres Jepchirchir (f)
 May 8:  Prague Marathon
 Winners:  Lawrence Cherono (m) /  Lucy Karimi (f)
 May 21:  Karlovy Vary Half Marathon
 Winners:  Abraham Akopesha (m) /  Joyceline Jepkosgei (f)
 May 22:  Great Manchester Run
 Winners:  Kenenisa Bekele (m) /  Tirunesh Dibaba (f)
 May 28 & 29:  Ottawa Race Weekend
 Men's 10K winner:  Mohammed Ziani
 Women's 10K winner:  Peres Jepchirchir
 Men's Marathon winner:  Dino Sefir
 Women's Marathon winner:  Koren Jelela
 June 4:  České Budějovice Half Marathon
 Winners:  Barselius Kipyego (m) /  Ashete Bekere (f)
 June 25:  Olomouc Half Marathon
 Winners:  Stanley Biwott (m) /  Mary Jepkosgei Keitany (f)
 July 3:  Gold Coast Marathon
 Winners:  Kenneth Mburu Mungara (m) /  Misato Horie (f)
 July 31:  Bogotá Half Marathon
 Winners:  Tadese Tola (m) /  Purity Rionoripo (f)
 September 10:  Prague Grand Prix
 Winners:  Abraham Kipyatich (m) /  Violah Jepchumba (f)
 September 17:  Ústí nad Labem Half Marathon
 Winners:  Barselius Kipyego (m) /  Peres Jepchirchir (f)
 September 17:  Beijing Marathon
 Winners:  Mekuant Ayenew (m) /  Meseret Mengistu (f)
 September 18:  Sydney Marathon
 Winners:  Tomohiro Tanigawa (m) /  Makda Harun (f)
 October 2:  Lisbon Marathon
 Winners:  Alfred Kering (m) /  Sarah Chepchirchir (f)
 October 2:  Portugal Half Marathon
 Winners:  Nguse Tesfaldet (m) /  Genet Yalew (f)
 October 16:  Amsterdam Marathon
 Winners:  Daniel Wanjiru (m) /  Meselech Melkamu (f)
 October 16:  Toronto Waterfront Marathon
 Winners:  Philemon Rono (m) /  Shure Demise (f)
 October 23:  Valencia Half Marathon
 Winners:  Stephen Kosgei Kibet (m) /  Peres Jepchirchir (f)
 October 30:  Frankfurt Marathon
 Winners:  Mark Korir (m) /  Mamitu Daska (f)
 October 30:  Shanghai Marathon
 Winners:  Stephen Mokoka (m) /  Roza Dereje (f)
 November 13:  Istanbul Marathon
 Winners:  Ali Kaya (m) /  Violah Jepchumba (f)
 November 20:  Maraton Valencia Trinidad Alfonso
 Winners:  Victor Kipchirchir (m) /  Valary Jemeli Aiyabei (f)
 December 4:  Fukuoka Marathon (co-final & men only)
 Winner:  Yemane Tsegay
 December 4:  Singapore Marathon (co-final)
 Winners:  Felix Kiptoo Kirwa (m) /  Rebecca Kangogo Chesir (f)

2016 IAAF Road Race Label Events (Silver)
 January 31:  Osaka International Ladies Marathon (women only)
 Winner:  Kayoko Fukushi
 February 7:  Kagawa Marugame Half Marathon
 Winners:  Goitom Kifle (m) /  Eunice Kirwa (f)
 April 3:  Daegu Marathon
 Winners:  James Kwambai (m) /  Caroline Kilel (f)
 April 10:  Great Ireland Run
 Winners:  Andy Maud (m) /  Fionnuala McCormack (f)
 April 10:  Hannover Marathon
 Winners:  Lusapho April (m) /  Edinah Kwambai (f)
 April 17:  DOZ Marathon Lodz with PZU
 Winners:  Abraraw Misganaw (m) /  Racheal Mutgaa (f)
 April 24:  Madrid Marathon
 Winners:  Peter Kiplagat Chebet (m) /  Askale Alemayehu (f)
 April 24:  Warsaw Marathon
 Winners:  Artur Kozłowski (m) /  Kumesci Sichala (f)
 May 8:  Yellow River Estuary International Marathon
 Winners:  Dickson Kipsang Tuwei (m) /  Eunice Chumba (f)
 May 15:  Gifu Seiryu Half Marathon
 Winners:  Patrick Mwaka (m) /  Eunice Kirwa (f)
 September 18:  Cape Town Marathon
 Winners:  Asefa Mengstu Negewo (m) /  Tish Jones (f)
 September 18:  Dam tot Damloop
 Winners:  Edwin Kiptoo (m) /  Alice Aprot Nawowuna (f)
 September 18:  Copenhagen Half Marathon
 Winners:  James Mwangi Wangari (m) /  Hiwot Gebrekidan (f)
 October 30:  Marseille-Cassis 20km
 Winners:  Henry Kiplagat (m) /  Joyline Jepkosgei (f)
 November 13:  Saitama International Marathon (women only)
 Winner:  Flomena Cheyech Daniel
 November 13:  Beirut Marathon
 Winners:  Edwin Kibet Kiptoo (m) /  Tigist Girma (f)
 December 18:  Corrida de Houilles
 Winners:  Cornelius Kangogo (m) /  Viola Kibiwot (f)
 December 31:  San Silvestre Vallecana (final)
 Winners:  Nguse Tesfaldet (m) /  Brigid Chepchirchir Kosgei (f)

2016 IAAF Road Race Label Events (Bronze)
 January 17:  Houston Marathon
 Winners:  Gebo Burka (m) /  Biruktayit Degefa Eshetu (f)
 February 14:  Mitja Marató de Barcelona
 Winners:  Vincent Kipruto (m) /  Florence Kiplagat (f)
 February 21:  Seville Marathon
 Winners:  Cosmas Kiplimo Lagat (m) /  Paula González (f)
 March 13:  Barcelona Marathon
 Winners:  Dino Sefir (m) /  Valerie Aiyabei (f)
 March 20:  Taipei International Marathon
 Winners:  William Chebon Chebor (m) /  Olha Kotovska (f)
 March 20:  Chongqing International Marathon
 Winners:  Kelkile Gezahegn (m) /  Liu Ruihuan (f)
 April 3:  Milano City Marathon
 Winners:  Ernest Kiprono Ngeno (m) /  Brigid Kosgei (f)
 April 17:  Nagano Olympic Commemorative Marathon
 Winners:  Jairus Chanchima (m) /  Shasho Insermu (f)
 April 17:  Brighton Marathon
 Winners:  Duncan Maiyo (m) /  Grace Momanyi (f)
 April 24:  Istanbul Half Marathon
 Winners:  Ali Kaya (m) /  Violah Jepchumba (f)
 May 7:  Okpekpe International 10 km Road Race
 Winners:  Simon Cheprot (m) /  Polline Njeru (f)
 May 8:  Geneva Marathon
 Winners:  Julius Chepkwony (m) /  Jane Kiptoo (f)
 May 15:  Riga Marathon
 Winners:  Dominic Kangor (m) /  Shitaye Gemechu (f)
 May 29:  Edinburgh Marathon
 Winners:  Boaz Kiprono (m) /  Eddah Jepkosgei (f)
 June 11:  Lanzhou International Marathon
 Winners:  Robert Kwambai (m) /  Tsehay Desalegn (f)
 June 18:  Corrida de Langueux
 Winners:  Robert Kaptingei (m) /  Meskerem Amare (f)
 June 26:  B.A.A. 10K
 Winners:  Daniel Kipchumba Chebii (m) /  Shalane Flanagan (f)
 August 28:  Mexico City Marathon
 Winners:  Emmanuel Mnangat Chamer (m) /  Diana Lobačevskė (f)
 September 25:  Warsaw Marathon
 Winners:  Ezekiel Omullo (m) /  Gladys Kibiwot (f)
 October 2:  Bournemouth Marathon
 Winners:  Stanley Kiprotich Bett (m) /  Eddah Jepkosgei (f)
 October 2:  Košice Peace Marathon
 Winners:  David Kemboi Kiyeng (m) /  Chaltu Tafa Waka (f)
 October 2:  Cardiff Half Marathon
 Winners:  Shedrack Korir (m) /  Violah Jepchumba (f)
 October 23:  Venice Marathon
 Winners:  Julius Chepkwony Rotich (m) /  Priscah Jepleting Cherono (f)
 November 13:  French Riviera Marathon
 Winners:  Elisha Kipchirchir (m) /  Konjit Tilahun (f)
 November 20:  Boulogne-Billancourt Half Marathon
 Winners:  Morris Munene (m) /  Gebeyanesh Ayele (f)
 November 20:  Delhi Half Marathon
 Winners:  Eliud Kipchoge (m) /  Worknesh Degefa (f)
 December 11:  Guangzhou Marathon (final)
 Winners:  Salah-Eddine Bounasr (m) /  Aynalem Kassahun

European Athletics Association (EAA)
 July 6 – 10: 2016 European Athletics Championships in  Amsterdam
  won the gold medal tally.  and  won 16 overall medals each.
 July 14 – 17: 2016 European Athletics Youth Championships in  Tbilisi (debut event)
  won both the gold and overall medal tallies.
 December 11: 2016 European Cross Country Championships in  Chia, Italy
 Men's winner:  Aras Kaya
 Women's winner:  Yasemin Can

Confederation of African Athletics (CAA)
 March 12: 2016 African Cross Country Championships in  Yaoundé
 Senior Men:  James Gitahi Rungaru
 Senior Women:  Alice Aprot Nawowuna
 Junior Men:  Isaac Kipsang
 Junior Women:  Miriam Cherop
 June 20 – 26: 2016 African Championships in Athletics in  Durban
  won both the gold and overall medal tallies.

NACAC
 March 4 & 5: 2016 NACAC Cross Country Championships in  Vargas
 Men's winner:  Donald Cowart
 Women's winner:  Allison Grace Morgan
 June 17 – 19: 2016 Central American Championships in Athletics in  San Salvador
 Overall winners:  (110.50 points), 2.  (102.50 points), 3.  (86 points)
 July 13 – 18: 2016 NACAC Under-23 Championships in Athletics in  San Salvador
 The  won both the gold and overall medal tallies.

CONSUDATLE
 April 10: 2016 South American Marathon Championships in  Montevideo
 Men's winner:  Aguelmis Rojas
 Women's winner:  Gladys Machacuay
 May 29: 2016 South American Half Marathon Championships in  Asunción
 Men's winner:  Ferdinan Pacheco
 Women's winner:  Joziane da Silva
 September 24 & 25: 2016 South American Under-23 Championships in Athletics in  Lima
  won both the gold and overall medal tallies.
 November 12 & 13: 2016 South American Youth Championships in Athletics in  Concordia, Entre Ríos
  won both the gold and overall medal tallies.

Asian Athletics Association (AAA)
 February 19 – 21: 2016 Asian Indoor Athletics Championships in  Doha
  won the gold medal tally.  won the overall medal tally.
 February 29: 2016 Asian Cross Country Championships in  Manama
 Men:  Albert Kibichii Rop
 Women:  Eunice Chumba
 Junior Men:  Ali Abdi
 Junior Women:  Dalila Abdulkadir
 June 2 – 6: 2016 Asian Junior Athletics Championships in  Ho Chi Minh City
  won both the gold and overall medal tallies.

Oceania Athletics Association (OAA)
 Note: The Oceania Athletics Championships were divided into Polynesian, Micronesian, and Melanesian regional athletics championships.
 April 7 – 9: 2016 Polynesian Regional Championships in Athletics in  Papeete (indoor)
 For results, click here.
 June 3 – 5: 2016 Micronesian Regional Championships in Athletics in  Pohnpei
 For results, click here.
 July 2 & 3: 2016 Oceania Marathon and Half Marathon Championships in  Gold Coast, Queensland
 For the regular marathon results, click here.
 Men's Half Marathon winner:  Duer Yoa
 Women's Half Marathon winner:  Cassie Fien
 July 7 – 9: 2016 Melanesian Championships in Athletics in  Suva
  won both the gold and overall medal tallies.
 August 7: 2016 Oceania Cross Country Championships in  Auckland
 Men's 10 km CC:  Nicholas Wightman
 Women's 10 km CC:  Laura Nagel

2016 IAAF Diamond League
 Note: The Adidas Grand Prix event in New York City has been replaced by Rabat here.
 May 6: Qatar Athletic Super Grand Prix in  Doha
 The  won the gold medal tally.  won the overall medal tally.
 May 14: Shanghai Golden Grand Prix in 
China won the overall medal tally.
Kenya won the overall medal tally. 
 May 28: Prefontaine Classic in  Eugene, Oregon
 The  won both the gold and overall medal tallies.
 June 2: Golden Gala in  Rome
  won the gold medal tally.  won the overall medal tally.
 June 5: British Grand Prix in  Birmingham
 The  won both the gold and overall medal tallies.
 June 9: Bislett Games in  Oslo
  won the gold medal tally. The  won the overall medal tally. 
 June 16: Stockholm Bauhaus Athletics in 
  won both the gold and overall medal tallies.
 July 15: Herculis in  Fontvieille, Monaco
  won both the gold and overall medal tallies.
 July 22 & 23: London Grand Prix in 
  won the gold medal tally. The  won the overall medal tally.
 August 25: Athletissima in  Lausanne
 The  won both the gold and overall medal tallies.
 August 27: Meeting Areva in  Saint-Denis
 The  won both the gold and overall medal tallies.
 September 1: Weltklasse Zürich in 
 The  won both the gold and overall medal tallies.
 September 9: Memorial Van Damme (final) in  Brussels
 The  won both the gold and overall medal tallies.

2016 IAAF World Indoor Tour
 Note: The Russian Winter Meeting event, scheduled for February 14, has been suspended, due to WADA's reports and the IAAF votes against the ARAF.
 February 6: Weltklasse in Karlsruhe in 
 The  won both the gold and overall medal tallies.
 February 14: New Balance Indoor Grand Prix in  Roxbury, Boston
 The  won both the gold and overall medal tallies.
 February 17: XL Galan in  Stockholm
 Eight nations won a gold medal each.  won the overall medal tally.
 February 20: Sainsbury's Glasgow Indoor Grand Prix (final) in 
  won both the gold and overall medal tallies.

2016 IAAF Cross Country Permit
 November 15, 2015: Cross de Atapuerca in  Atapuerca, Province of Burgos
 Winners:  Imane Merga (m) /  Belaynesh Oljira (f)
 January 6: Campaccio in  San Giorgio su Legnano
 Winners:  Imane Merga (m) /  Alice Aprot (f)
 January 16: Antrim International Cross Country in  Antrim, County Antrim
 Winners:  Aweke Ayalew (m) /  Alice Aprot (f)
 January 17: Cross Internacional de Itálica in  Seville
 Winners:  Tamirat Tola (m) /  Faith Kipyegon (f)
 January 24: Cross Internacional Juan Muguerza in  Elgoibar
 Winners:  Aweke Ayalew (m) /  Irene Chepet Cheptai (f)
 January 31: Cinque Mulini in  San Vittore Olona
 Winners:  Jairus Birech (m) /  Faith Kipyegon (f)
 February 13: IAAF Permit/Athletics Kenya Cross Country in  Nairobi
 Winners:  Geoffrey Kipsang (m) /  Alice Aprot (f)
 March 13: Almond Blossom Cross Country (final) in  Albufeira
 Winners:  Nelson Cruz (m) /  Carla Salome Rocha (f)

2016 IAAF Race Walking Challenge
 February 21: Oceania 20 km Race Walk Championships in  Adelaide
 Men's winner:  Dane Bird-Smith
 Women's winner:  Rachel Tallent
 March 6: Circuito Internacional de Marcha 2016 in  Ciudad Juárez
 Men's 50 km walk winner:  Andrés Chocho
 Men's 20 km walk winner:  Horacio Nava
 Men's 10 km walk winner:  Andrés Olivas
 Women's 20 km walk winner:  María Guadalupe González
 Women's 10 km walk winner:  Valeria Ortuño
 March 19: IAAF Race Walking Challenge Permit Meeting Dudinska 50 in  Dudince
 Men's 50 km walk winner:  Rafał Augustyn
 Men's 20 km walk winner:  Tom Bosworth
 Women's 20 km walk winner:  Eleonora Giorgi
 March 20: Asian 20 km Race Walking Championships in  Nomi, Ishikawa
 Men's winner:  Daisuke Matsunaga
 Women's winner:  Wang Na
 April 3: South American Race Walking Cup in  Guayaquil
 Men's winner:  Andrés Chocho
 Women's winner:  Érica de Sena
 April 9: 25º Grande Prémio Internacional de Rio Maior em Marcha Atlética in 
 Men's winner:  Álvaro Martín
 Women's winner:  Qieyang Shenjie
 April 23: 2016 IAAF Race Walking Challenge in  Taicang
 Men's winner:  Pedro Daniel Gomez
 Women's winner:  Wang Yingliu
 May 28: XXX Gran Premio Cantones de La Coruña in 
 Men's winner:  Wang Zhen
 Women's winner:  Liu Hong
 June 22 – 26: Part of the 2016 African Championships in Athletics (final) in  Durban
 Men's winner:  Samuel Ireri Gathimba
 Women's winner:  Grace Wanjiru

2016 IAAF Combined Events Challenge
 March 31 & April 1: Oceania Combined Events Championships in  Sydney
 Decathlon winner:  Cedric Dubler (8,114 points)
 Heptathlon winner:  Sophie Stanwell (5,572 points)
 April 2 & 3: African Combined Events Championships in  Moka (Réduit)
 Decathlon winner:  Guillaume Thierry (7,481 points)
 Heptathlon winner:  Marthe Koala (5,771 points)
 April 29 & 30: 29th Multistars - Trofeo Zerneri Acciai in  Florence
 Decathlon winner:  Lars Vikan Rise (7,868 points)
 Heptathlon winner:  Vanessa Spínola (6,100 points)
 May 28 & 29: 42nd Hypo-Meeting in  Götzis
 Decathlon winner:  Damian Warner (8,523 points)
 Heptathlon winner:  Brianne Theisen-Eaton (6,765 points)
 June 10 & 11: 10th TNT Express Meeting in  Kladno
 Decathlon winner:  Lars Vikan Rise (7,925 points)
 Heptathlon winner:  Kateřina Cachová (6,328 points)
 June 17 – 19: 2016 Pan American Combined Events Cup in  Ottawa
 Decathlon winner:  Filip Scott (7,726 points)
 Heptathlon winner:  Quintunya Chapman (6,035 points)
 June 25 & 26: 20th Mehrkampf-Meeting Ratingen in 
 Decathlon winner:  Arthur Abele (8,605 points)
 Heptathlon winner:  Jessica Ennis-Hill (6,733 points)
 July 1 – 10: Part of the U.S. Olympic Trials in  Eugene, Oregon
 Decathlon winner:  Ashton Eaton (8,750 points)
 Heptathlon winner:  Barbara Nwaba (6,494 points)
 July 6 – 10: Part of the 2016 European Athletics Championships in  Amsterdam
 Decathlon winner:  Thomas Van der Plaetsen (8,218 points)
 Heptathlon winner:  Anouk Vetter (6,626 points)
 September 17 & 18: Décastar (final) in  Talence
 Decathlon winner:  Oleksiy Kasyanov (8,077 points)
 Heptathlon winner:  Nadine Broersen (6,377 points)

2016 IAAF World Challenge & IAAF Hammer Throw Challenge
 Note: The event for Rabat here has been promoted to the 2016 IAAF Diamond League.
 March 5: Melbourne Track Classic in 
 World Challenge:  won both the gold and overall medal tallies.
 Hammer Throw winner:  Matthew Denny
 May 7: Jamaica International Invitational in  Kingston, Jamaica
 World Challenge: The  won both the gold and overall medal tallies.
 Hammer Throw winner:  Gwen Berry
 May 8: Golden Grand Prix in  Kawasaki, Kanagawa (World Challenge only)
 World Challenge: The  won the gold medal tally.  won the overall medal tally.
 May 18: IAAF World Challenge Beijing in 
 World Challenge:  won both the gold and overall medal tallies.
 Hammer Throw winner:  Zhang Wenxiu
 May 19 & 20: Golden Spike Ostrava in the 
 World Challenge:  won both the gold and overall medal tallies.
 Men's Hammer Throw winner:  Paweł Fajdek
 Women's Hammer Throw winner:  Anita Włodarczyk
 May 22: Fanny Blankers-Koen Games in  Hengelo (World Challenge only)
 World Challenge:  and  won 3 gold medals each. The  won the overall medal tally. 
 May 25: Meeting Grand Prix IAAF de Dakar in 
 World Challenge: The  won the gold medal tally. The United States and  won 5 overall medals each.
 Men's Hammer Throw winner:  Pavel Bareisha
 Women's Hammer Throw winner:  Zalina Marghieva
 June 18: Janusz Kusociński Memorial in  Szczecin (Hammer Throw Challenge only)
 Men's Hammer Throw winner:  Paweł Fajdek
 Women's Hammer Throw winner:  Anita Włodarczyk
 June 19: Grande Premio Brasil Caixa de Atletismo in  São Bernardo do Campo
 World Challenge:  won both the gold and overall medal tallies.
 Women's Hammer Throw winner:  Jennifer Dahlgren
 World Challenge:  won both the gold and overall medal tallies.
 June 29: Paavo Nurmi Games in  Turku (Hammer Throw Challenge only)
 Men's Hammer Throw winner:  Paweł Fajdek
 July 18: István Gyulai Memorial in  Székesfehérvár (Hammer Throw Challenge only)
 Women's Hammer Throw winner:  Anita Włodarczyk
 World Challenge:  won both the gold and overall medal tallies.
 September 6: Hanžeković Memorial (final) in  Zagreb (World Challenge only)
 World Challenge: The  won both the gold and overall medal tallies.
 September 11: Rieti Meeting in 
 Event cancelled.

Deaths

References

External links

 IAAF Official Website

 
Athletics
2016